Void may refer to:

Science, engineering, and technology 
 Void (astronomy), the spaces between galaxy filaments that contain no galaxies
 Void (composites), a pore that remains unoccupied in a composite material
 Void, synonym for vacuum, a space containing no matter
 Void, a bubble within a mechanical part that causes cavitation when it collapses
 Void, an unwanted air pocket formed during injection moulding 
 VoID or Vocabulary of Interlinked Datasets, an RDF vocabulary to enable the discovery and use of linked data sets
 Void coefficient, the change in the reactivity of a nuclear reactor when voids form in moderator or coolant fluids
 Void Linux, a Linux distribution
 Void ratio, the volume of void-space to solid space in a material
 Void safety, in object-oriented programming, a guarantee that no object references will have null values
 Void type, in programming languages, a keyword indicating the absence of data
 Void set or empty set, the mathematical set with no elements
 Voiding, the act of Urination

Arts, entertainment, and media

Characters
 Void, a malevolent alter ego of superhero Sentry (Robert Reynolds)
 Void (comics), one of the original team of the Wildcats
 Void, the main antagonist in the 2000 video game Sonic Shuffle
 Voids, the villains in the Zbots action-figures franchise
 Void Termina, Void Soul, and Void, the main villain(s) in Kirby Star Allies
 Void, a member of the God Hand and one of the main villains in Berserk

Films
 Void (film), a 2013 Lebanese film

Literature
 A Void, a 1969 French novel written without using the letter e by Georges Perec 
 Void Trilogy, a science-fiction series by Peter F. Hamilton

Music 
 Void (band), a Washington, D.C.-based hardcore punk band
 Void (Intronaut album), 2006
 VOID (NaNa album), 1999
 Void (Vanna album), 2014
 Void (War of Ages album), 2019
 VOID (Video Overview in Deceleration), a 2005 DVD by the Flaming Lips
 ØØ Void, a 2000 album by Sunn O)))
 Voids (album), a 2017 album by Minus the Bear
 Void (EP), an EP by Destroy the Runner

Other arts, entertainment, and media
 Void (cards), to have no cards of a particular suit in one's hand during a card game
 Void (fanzine), a major science-fiction fanzine started in the 1950s
 Void Indigo, a comic book series written by Steve Gerber and drawn by Val Mayerik

Religion and philosophy
 The Void (philosophy)
 Void (classical element), English for Kū, one of the five elements in Japanese Buddhism
 Śūnyatā, a Buddhist philosophical concept translated most often as emptiness and sometimes voidness

Other uses 
 Void (law), an action, document or transaction that has no legal effect
 Nothing

See also 
 The Void (disambiguation)